Martha Foore Boswell Lloyd (June 9, 1905 – July 2, 1958) was an American jazz singer and pianist, and the eldest of the vocal trio the Boswell Sisters. Her younger sisters were Connee and Helvetia "Vet" Boswell.

The Boswell Sisters started their career in vaudeville in their native New Orleans. In 1925 they performed on local radio as an instrumental act. Martha played piano, Connee played cello, saxophone, and guitar, and Vet played banjo, guitar, and violin. When they became a vocal act, Connee was lead vocalist. They began recording in 1930, and singing songs from Hollywood films including Monkey Business starring the Marx Brothers, however both Martha and Helvetia decided to leave the group in 1936 to begin motherhood, Connee continued to a solo singing career, and appeared in radio, film and television, and made recordings into the 1960s.

References

1905 births
1958 deaths
American jazz musicians
Jazz musicians from New Orleans